Monte Disgrazia or Munt Des'giascia (3,678 m) is a mountain in the Bregaglia range in the Italian Alps. It is the highest peak in the Val Masino group, situated south of the Bernina Range.

It has five glaciers and five wild ridges and is a demanding climb.

The first ascent was by Leslie Stephen, E. S. Kennedy and Thomas Cox with guide Melchior Anderegg on 23 August 1862. Their route over the Preda Rossa glacier and the northwest ridge is the easiest one and has remained the normal climbing route.

Gallery

References

External links
 Monte Disgrazia on SummitPost
 Webcam of Monte Disgrazia

Mountains of Italy
Mountains of the Alps